Gornja Prisika is a village in the municipality of Tomislavgrad in Canton 10, the Federation of Bosnia and Herzegovina, Bosnia and Herzegovina. It is close to the Croatia-Bosnia Herzegovina border crossing.

Demographics 

According to the 2013 census, its population was 71, all Croats.

Footnotes

Bibliography 

 

Populated places in Tomislavgrad